The 1918 Lehigh Brown and White football team was an American football team that represented Lehigh University as an independent during the 1918 college football season. In its seventh season under head coach Tom Keady, the team compiled a 4–4. The team played its home games at Taylor Stadium in Bethlehem, Pennsylvania.

Schedule

References

Lehigh
Lehigh Mountain Hawks football seasons
Lehigh football